Psychrobacter pasteurii is a Gram-negative, non-spore-forming and on-motile bacterium of the genus Psychrobacter.

References

External links
Type strain of Psychrobacter pasteurii at BacDive -  the Bacterial Diversity Metadatabase

Moraxellaceae
Bacteria described in 2017